Arthur Mkrtchyan (born on 9 September 1973) is a Armenian football coach and a former defender. He was capped 25 times for the Armenia national team.

National team statistics

External links
 
 
 

1973 births
Living people
Sportspeople from Yerevan
Soviet footballers
Armenian footballers
Armenia international footballers
Armenian expatriate footballers
FC Pyunik players
FC Torpedo Moscow players
FC Torpedo-2 players
PFC Krylia Sovetov Samara players
FC Mika players
FC Darida Minsk Raion players
Expatriate footballers in Russia
Armenian Premier League players
Russian Premier League players
Expatriate footballers in Belarus
Armenian expatriate sportspeople in Russia
Armenian expatriate sportspeople in Belarus
Association football defenders
Soviet Armenians
Armenian football managers
Armenian expatriate sportspeople in Kazakhstan